The Legislative Assembly of Kamchatka Krai is the regional parliament of Kamchatka Krai, a federal subject of Russia. Together with the executive and judicial branches, the Krai's legislative assembly is vested with power to control the krai's own affairs with moderate levels of autonomy from Moscow. All members are elected by public vote and are titled as deputies. The term of the deputies are currently 5 years long.

History
Kamchatka Oblast was formed on 2 December 1849 with Major-General Vasily Zavoyko appointed as its first governor. Due to its remote location and distance from the main seat of the Russian government, the administrative duties of Kamchatka was reorganized several times and even administrated from places like Amur and Primorsky. After the Soviets came into power, elections were carried out to fill up the revolutionary legislative and executive committees. In 1936, through the Soviet Union constitution, the power of the Kamchatka Regional Council of Workers' Deputies were limited down to executive and administrative duties while the Supreme Soviet of RSFSR took over legislative duties. In 1977, the council was renamed the Kamchatka Regional Council of People's Deputies. During the Russian constitutional crisis of 1993, the legislative body of Russia was dissolved and power was decentralized to the individual federal subjects by a presidential decree (No. 1617). The Legislative Assembly of Kamchatka Oblast and the Duma of Koryak Autonomous Okrug was thus formed in Kamchatka Oblast and Koryak Autonomous Okrug separately respectively. Following a referendum on the question of unification on 23 October 2005, the two entities were thus merged on 1 July 2007 to form Kamchatka Krai, but the respective legislative bodies continued to work separately for about five months till they were merged as well.

Structure
The Legislative Assembly of Kamchatka Krai is unicameral just like most legislative assembly bodies found in other Russian federal subjects. It currently comprises 28 deputies, with 14 of them running in multi-seat constituencies and the other 14 in the single electoral district. Deputies are elected by public vote once every 5 years, whereby winners are determined by a combination of two voting systems, which are the first-past-the-post voting and party-list proportional representation, in what is known as the parallel voting system. The Duma also internally elects a legislative representative to the Federation Council, which is the Upper House of Russia's legislative branch.

The executive branch of Kamchatka works closely with the Legislative Assembly. The executive branch is also known as the government of Kamchatka and is headed by the Governor, who is the highest ranking person in the krai. The Governor is not to be confused with the Chairman of the Legislative Assembly, who is head of the Legislative Assembly only.

Previous legislative assemblies

References

Government of Russia
Legislatures of the federal subjects of Russia
Politics of Kamchatka Krai